The Men's 400 metres T44 event at the 2012 Summer Paralympics took place at the London Olympic Stadium from 7 to 8 September.

Records
Prior to the competition, the existing world and Paralympic records were as follows:

Results

Round 1
Competed 7 September 2012 from 21:45. Qual. rule: first 3 in each heat (Q) plus the 2 fastest other times (q) qualified.

Heat 1

Heat 2

Final
Competed 8 September 2012 at 21:57.

 
Q = qualified by place. q = qualified by time. WR = World Record. PR = Paralympic Record. RR = Regional Record. PB = Personal Best.

References

Athletics at the 2012 Summer Paralympics